Wallback Wildlife Management Area is located on  northwest of Clay in Clay, Kanawha and Roane Counties, West Virginia.

References

External links
West Virginia DNR District 3 Wildlife Management Areas
WVDNR map of Wallback Wildlife Management Area

Wildlife management areas of West Virginia
Protected areas of Clay County, West Virginia
Protected areas of Kanawha County, West Virginia
Protected areas of Roane County, West Virginia